The Wedding of Valeni (German: Die Hochzeit von Valeni) is a 1914 Austrian drama film directed by Jacob Fleck. It was produced by Wiener Kunstfilm, the leading Austrian studio of the era. It is an adaptation of a play by Ludwig Ganghofer.

Cast
Carl Ludwig Friese as Baku 
Polly Janisch as Sandra 
Herr Normann as Tschuku 
Max Neufeld as Jonel

See also
Slaves of Love (1924)

References

External links

Austro-Hungarian films
Austrian silent feature films
Austrian drama films
Films directed by Jacob Fleck
Austrian black-and-white films
1914 drama films
Films based on works by Ludwig Ganghofer
Austrian films based on plays
Fictional representations of Romani people
Silent drama films
1910s German-language films